Troy Michael Hebert (born April 19, 1966) is a politician from Jeanerette, Louisiana, who is the former commissioner of the Louisiana Office of Alcohol and Tobacco Control (ATC). Hebert was appointed commissioner by Republican Governor Bobby Jindal and served in the role until December 2015. He has served in the Louisiana House of Representatives and Louisiana State Senate.

References

Living people
Louisiana state senators
People from Jeanerette, Louisiana
Members of the Louisiana House of Representatives
Louisiana Democrats
1966 births
Farmers from Louisiana
American carpenters
Businesspeople from Louisiana
University of Louisiana at Lafayette alumni
Louisiana Independents
Catholics from Louisiana
Candidates in the 2016 United States Senate elections